Galatasaray Wheelchair Basketball Team is the wheelchair basketball section of Galatasaray SK, a major sports club in Istanbul, Turkey. Galatasaray play matches in 2.200-seat arena, called the Ahmet Cömert Sport Hall.

History
Galatasaray Wheelchair Basketball Team hold the Turkish title and currently play in European Champions Cup organised by IWBF Europe. Having only been founded in 2005, the basketball team has already won the IWBF Champions League twice in a row, in years 2007-08 and 2008–09, making them one of the finest wheelchair teams in Europe. Galatasaray Wheelchair Basketball Team also won the Kitakyushu Champions Cup and became world champions in 2008, 2009, 2011 and 2013.

Sponsorship naming
Due to sponsorship deals, Galatasaray have been also known as:

 Galatasaray (2005–2021)
 Galatasaray Tunç Holding (2021–present)

Home arenas
Ahmet Cömert Sport Hall (2005–2021)
Beylikdüzü Spor Kompleksi (2021–2022)
Ahmet Cömert Sport Hall (2022–present)

Technical staff

Current roster

Honours

Domestic competitions
 Turkish Wheelchair Basketball Super League:
 Winners (10): (record) 2006–07, 2007–08, 2008–09, 2009–10, 2010–11, 2011–12, 2012–13, 2013–14, 2014–15, 2017–18
 Turkish Wheelchair Basketball First League:
 Winners (1): 2005–06
 Sinan Erdem Wheelchair Basketball Cup:
 Winners (2): 2006, 2008
 Antalya Kepez Tournament:
 Winners (1): 2005

International competitions
 IWBF Champions Cup:
 Winners (5): 2008, 2009, 2011, 2013, 2014
 Finalist (1): 2012
 Kitakyushu Champions Cup:
 Winners (4): 2008, 2009, 2011, 2012
 André Vergauwen Cup:
 Winner (2): 2016–17, 2017–18
 Semi-finalist (1): 2006–07
 Chieti Tournament:
 Winners (1): 2007
 South Eastern Europe (SEE) Championship Cup:
 Winners (1): 2006

Head coaches

See also
 See also Galatasaray S.K. (men's basketball)
 See also Galatasaray S.K. (women's basketball)

References

External links
 Galatasaray S.K. official website 
 Unofficial Fan Site and Forum 
 International Wheelchair Basketball Federation 

 
Basketball teams established in 2005
Wheelchair basketball teams in Turkey
2005 establishments in Turkey
Galatasaray Basketball